José Agostinho Sequeira (born 7 June 1959), also known by his nom de guerre , is an East Timorese politician and former guerilla, and a member of the Fretilin political party. In 2006–2007, he was Vice Minister of Interior, and in 2017–2018 he was Minister for Defence and Security. Since 2018, he has been a Member of the National Parliament.

Early life and career
He attended school for twelve years. During the liberation struggle against Indonesia, he was a collaborator of the chief of staff of Falintil and Secretary of Region IV.

After the resumption of Timorese independence in 2002, Sequeira was appointed as the first director of the Timorese Resistance Archive and Museum ((AMRT)). From August 2002, he worked in Lisbon with the then  ( (FMS)) to build the archive. Following his return to East Timor in May 2006, he continued to work at the AMRT until 21 July 2006, when he was sworn in as Vice Minister of Interior in the II Constitutional Government.

Political career
Sequeira remained in office as Vice Minister, including in the III Constitutional Government, until 8 August 2007, when that government was replaced by the IV Constitutional Government. He later became president of the Falantil Veterans Foundation ( (FVF)).

From 2012 to 2017, Sequeira was one of the five members of the Council of State elected by the Parliament.

In the East Timorese parliamentary election of 2017, Sequeira was elected to the National Parliament as a member of the Fretilin list. On 15 September 2017, he was sworn in as Minister of Defence and Security in the VII Constitutional Government, and therefore had to give up his parliamentary seat in accordance with the Constitution. When it became clear that the Fretilin / PD minority government could not prevail in Parliament, President Francisco Guterres dissolved the Parliament and called new elections.

In the ensuing election held on 12 May 2018, Sequeira was re-elected as number 20 on the Fretilin list, and Fretilin became the strongest opposition party. Sequeira's term as Minister ended when the VIII Constitutional Government took office on 22 June 2018. He is now a member of the Parliamentary Committee on Foreign Affairs, Defence and Security (Committee B).

Honours

References

External links 

Defense ministers of East Timor
Fretilin politicians
Government ministers of East Timor
Living people
Members of the National Parliament (East Timor)
People from Lautém District
21st-century East Timorese politicians
1959 births